Oberottmarshausen station is a railway station in the municipality of Oberottmarshausen, in Bavaria, Germany. It is located on the Bobingen–Landsberg am Lech line of Deutsche Bahn.

Services
 the following services stop at Oberottmarshausen:

References

External links
 
 Oberottmarshausen layout 
 

Railway stations in Bavaria
Buildings and structures in Augsburg (district)